Charles Oswald Lelean (O.B.E) was born in 1867 in Tasmania, Australia and died at the age of 72 on 14 September 1942. He had spent a considerable part of his life being a missionary in Fiji. Rev Lelean served in Fiji for 36 years.

History of the Leleans

For many years the Lelean family believed that their name was French and that their ancestor could have been a Huguenot who fled France following the St Bartholomew's Day massacre. Research carried out in the 1960s by Leonard Lelean and Ronald Lelean Sharman however suggests that the name is much older than the time of the Huguenots, and may well derive from a Cornish place-name, Leighlean, meaning 'a flat, muddy place.

Other variants of the name are Lalean, Le Lean and Le Lane.

Rev Charles Lelean's great-great-great-grandfather, James Lelean was a contemporary of the great English evangelist, John Wesley. Rev Wesley had referred to Mr James Lelean as the kind farmer who showed him kindness amongst a hostile mob when he visited Mevagissey, Cornwall in 1753. John Wesley then presented James Lelean and his wife Mary with his silver buckles in thanks. The buckles are now in the Wesley Museum, City Road, London.

The http://freepages.genealogy.rootsweb.ancestry.com/~sterth/wills1777_81.htm Cornish Will Abstracts of 1777 - 1781] however records James Lelean as a fisherman of Mevagissey.

C.O Lelean's grandfather, John moved to Australia in the 1800s.

The Leleans in Fiji
Rev C.O Lelean married Edith Annie Shoebridge in April 1897 in Bushy Park, Tasmania, daughter of William Ebenezer Shoebridge and Anne Benson Mather. They had one daughter, Ella Lelean. Edith Lelean died in Fiji on 15 May 1906.

The early Methodist missions in Fiji served as education centres where students were taught to read and write as well as a rudimentary knowledge of medicine. This laid the foundations of formal education in Fiji. Fijian Methodist Ministers and Catechists were not only instrumental in spreading the Christian Gospel, but were also very effective in showing Fijians the benefits of literacy and proper hygiene.

Rev C.O Lelean spent twenty years of his service in Fiji as Senior Superintendent of the Davuilevu Mission and principal of the Methodist Theological College from 1914 to 1934.

He succeeded Reverend William Bennett as principal of the Fiji Methodist Theological College which was moved from Navuloa to Davuilevu in 1907.

Charles Lelean's nephew, Rev Arthur D. Lelean, worked as a missionary in Fiji from 1918 to 1936.

Lelean Memorial School
When, due to the military needs of the Pacific Campaign of the Second World War, a school for boys was moved from the Toorak Boys School in Suva and established in 1943 at the Davuilevu, Methodist Church of Fiji and Rotuma compound by Mr William Earnest Donnelly of New Zealand, the Davuilevu Council instructed Donnelly to name it the Lelean Memorial School after Reverend Charles Oswald Lelean.  Rev C.O Lelean had impacted numerous lives and generations of Fijians through his long and dedicated service and was a much loved minister.

References
 THORNLEY, Andrew, and Tauga VULAONO, 1996, Mai Kea Ki Vei: Stories of Methodism in Fiji and Rotuma, 1835–1995, Fiji Methodist Church, Suva.
 WOOD, A. Harold, 1978, Overseas Missions of the Australian Methodist Church, vol 3: Fiji, Aldersgate Press, Melbourne.
 Lake, J., et al., 2001, Diversity and Vitality: The Methodist and Nonconformist Chapels of Cornwall, Cornwall Archaeological Unit, Truro.
 Luker, D., 1986, ‘Revivalism in Theory and Practice: The case of Cornish Methodism’, Journal of Ecclesiastical History 37, 603-619.
 Luker, D., 1987, ‘Cornish Methodism, Revivalism, and Popular Belief, c. 1780-1870’, Unpublished PhD thesis, University of Oxford.
 Lelean website of family ancestry and history

1867 births
1942 deaths
Methodist missionaries in Fiji
People from Tasmania
Methodist Church of Fiji and Rotuma
Australian people of Cornish descent
Fijian people of Cornish descent
English Methodist missionaries
Australian expatriates in Fiji
Australian Methodist missionaries